The Salonika Agreement (also called the Thessaloniki Accord) was a treaty signed on 31 July 1938 between Bulgaria and the Balkan Entente (Greece, Romania, Turkey and Yugoslavia). The signatories were, for the former, Prime Minister Georgi Kyoseivanov and, for the latter, in his capacity as President of the Council of the Balkan Entente, Ioannis Metaxas, Prime Minister and Foreign Minister of Greece.

Background
The agreement was the result of the realization by the Entente that Bulgaria alone could not threaten the members of the Entente acting in concert and that the Bulgarian government desired to follow a policy of peace. That was shown by at least two signs. A protocol signed at Belgrade on 17 March 1934 by the Balkan Entente was published privately in May and revealed that the members had plans to occupy Bulgaria jointly if efforts to suppress terrorist organizations operating out of its territory were not successful. The new Bulgarian government of Kimon Georgiev, coming to power on 19 May, responded to the private revelation by clamping down on the Internal Macedonian Revolutionary Organization. 

Also, on 24 January 1937, the Bulgarian–Yugoslav Treaty of Eternal Friendship was concluded, which was approved by the other members of the Entente although Greece was initially very hostile. In November 1936, the chiefs of staff of the four Balkan powers signed a draft military alliance, which was confirmed as an integral part of the Balkan Pact at the meeting of the Balkan Council on 15–18 February 1937.

Terms
The agreement removed the arms restrictions placed on Bulgaria after World War I by the Treaty of Neuilly-sur-Seine and allowed it to occupy the demilitarised zone bordering Greece. The demilitarised zones along the Turkish borders with Bulgaria and Greece, a result of the Treaty of Lausanne, were also abandoned. All the parties committed to a policy of non-aggression, but Bulgaria was not forced to abandon its territorial revisionism.

Bulgarian rearmament
Bulgaria had long protested the restrictions placed on armaments at Neuilly, but unlike Austria, Germany and Hungary, it had a good track record of abiding by them. In the 1930s, it began to evade them by buying military equipment from Germany since it was refused orders placed in the United Kingdom. The Bulgarians argued, with the support of the United States, that the League of Nations, which was designed to protect weak and disarmed states, was not powerful enough to protect Bulgaria.

In November 1937, when the pace of rearmament had picked up, a British memorandum advised a "blind eye" policy towards it and pressured the Entente and France to do the same to prevent Bulgaria from falling under the influence of the Italo-German Axis. The British memo specified that Bulgaria was set to violate all the pertinent articles of the treaty:
The relevant articles of the treaty are #78, which prohibits fortification of any further places in Bulgaria, #81, which prohibits the importation of arms, munitions, and war materials of all kinds, #82, prohibiting the manufacture and importation into Bulgaria of armoured cars, tanks and any similar machines suitable for use in war, #86, which prohibits the construction or acquisition of any submarine, even for commercial purposes and #89, which prohibits the inclusion in the armed forces of Bulgaria of any military or naval air forces.

Turkey strongly opposed Bulgaria's accelerated rearmament in 1934, especially on account of the weakness of the Greek army. By the time of the Salonika Agreement, however, it had been accepted as a fait accompli.

Notes

Sources

1938 in Greece
Interwar-period treaties
Treaties of the Kingdom of Bulgaria
Treaties of the Kingdom of Romania
Treaties of the Kingdom of Greece
Treaties of the Kingdom of Yugoslavia
Treaties of Turkey
July 1938 events
Modern history of Thessaloniki